Baird is an unincorporated community located in Sunflower County, Mississippi, United States.

The settlement was named for John Rupert Baird, the former owner of the town site.

In the early 1900s, a station of the Southern Railway was located in Baird.  The track, originally crossing the state from Columbus to Greenville, is currently owned and operated by the Columbus and Greenville Railway, and line is now truncated as far as Greenwood.

Gallery

References

Unincorporated communities in Sunflower County, Mississippi
Unincorporated communities in Mississippi